Juan Pedro (J.P.) Villamán (April 5, 1959 – May 30, 2005) was a Dominican-American sportscaster who served as the Spanish language play-by-play announcer for the Boston Red Sox.

The youngest of nine children, Villamán fell in love with broadcasting at an early age. At age of 13, he called baseball and basketball games from a local radio station in San Francisco de Macorís, where he was born and raised by his aunt, Orfelina Villamán, after his mother died giving birth to him. Like most Dominicans, Villamán played baseball and was a pretty good catcher. His best sport, though, was basketball; he played on the national teams in Panama and Puerto Rico.

Villamán came to the U.S. in 1986 and followed the trail blazed from New York City to Lawrence, Massachusetts by thousands of other Dominican immigrants. He landed a job with radio station WCCM in Lawrence in 1990. Four years later, he was recommended for the job when the Red Sox were looking for a Spanish-speaking broadcaster for a new radio venture aimed at reaching the growing population of baseball-mad Latinos in cities like Lawrence and Worcester. Villamán was hired as a part-time broadcaster by Bill Kulik, a former freelance TV sports producer and writer and baseball fanatic. For the next seven seasons, Villamán was the play-by-play announcer for selected Red Sox home games carried by small Spanish-language stations.

The initially haphazard venture really took off after Pedro Martínez joined the Red Sox in 1998. Villamán said the Red Sox ace brought thousands, maybe even millions, of Latino fans into "Red Sox Nation."  Before the 2001 season, Kulik organized the Spanish Beisbol Network to carry every Red Sox game, home and away, and made Villamán a permanent Red Sox announcer alongside young newcomer Adrian Garcia Marquez who also called games for ESPN Deportes. The radio show aired in Massachusetts, Connecticut, Rhode Island and New York. Villamán's Spanish commentary was also available on NESN, and baseball fans as far away as the Dominican Republic, Colombia, Costa Rica, Mexico, Nicaragua, Panama, Venezuela and Spain heard him via satellite. They would sometimes call into his pregame show, which pleased Villamán enormously. Listeners called him Papá Oso (Papa Bear)a nickname given to him by his friend and co-announcer Garcia Marquez.

In April 2005, at Fenway Park, Red Sox owners John Henry and Tom Werner showed their respect for Villamán and his worldwide audience by delivering him a diamond-encrusted World Series championship ring during his broadcast of home opener against the New York Yankees. The ring, which came with a notarized appraisal putting its value at $14,100, was the official acknowledgement that Villamán was part of the Red Sox extended family (500 or so got rings), from ushers to superstars. Villamán's ring also recognized the importance of the team's growing Latino fan base. With top Latin stars such as Manny Ramírez, David Ortiz, Édgar Rentería and, before, Pedro Martinez, Rich Garcés and Orlando Cabrera, the Red Sox are becoming Latin America's team.

On May 30, 2005, Villamán, at age 46, was on his way home around 3:40 a.m. after broadcasting from Yankee Stadium over the weekend. He died when his sport utility vehicle sideswiped a truck on Interstate 93 near Wilmington, Massachusetts, rolled down an embankment, and slammed into a tree. He was pronounced dead at the scene. The loss of the charismatic broadcaster was also felt deeply in San Francisco de Macoris, where he was raised. Portions of his funeral, held at St. Mary-Immaculate Conception Church in Lawrence, were broadcast live on three regional radio stations. He is buried at St. Mary's cemetery in Lawrence, Massachusetts.

Fact
In Game 4 of the 2004 World Series, Villamán got so excited when pitcher Keith Foulke threw the ball to first base, sealing the Red Sox's 86-year curse-ending victory, that his voice cracked during the broadcast. ¡Boston gana! (Boston wins!) he screamed into the microphone seven times, so loudly his voice became raspy.

Sources
Boston Globe

Media Blitz
Eagle Tribune
Noticiero Panamericano (Spanish)

1959 births
2005 deaths
Boston Red Sox announcers
Dominican Republic baseball players
Major League Baseball broadcasters
Road incident deaths in Massachusetts